The Hayes is a commercial area in the southern city centre of the Welsh capital, Cardiff. Centred on the road of that name leading south towards the east end of the city centre, the area is mostly pedestrianised and is the location of the Hayes Island Snack Bar.

At the north end of The Hayes is the Old Library, known as the Cardiff Free Library, Museum and Schools for Science and Art during its century (1882 to 1988) of use as the second incarnation of the city's central library. The latest, fourth permanent Cardiff Central Library opened in 2009 and is situated at the opposite end of the Hayes.

Scenes of BBC's Doctor Who and Torchwood have often been filmed here.

Architecture

Cardiff is famous for its Victorian arcades. These include the Royal Arcade and Morgan Arcade, both of which have entrances on The Hayes. Morgan Arcade is the present home to Spillers Records, which is the oldest record shop in the world.

Renovation
In 2006, the closure of the David Morgan department store saw a redevelopment of The Hayes. The David Morgan store was renovated, with the upper floors being converted to apartments with retail units below. A number of retailers moved into the area. 2009 saw the addition of the St David's 2 development anchored by a John Lewis department store and Central Library at the southern end of the Hayes. The St David's side of the Hayes brought new retail units and apartments running the full length of The Hayes. The street and surrounding area was repaved and landscaped, at St David's Hall a large screen has been attached to the exterior for public events.

One of the most prominent new features of The Hayes since its redevelopment is 'Alliance'. This 25m high sculpture by Jean Bernard Métais is a large stainless steel ring and pointed column.

Buildings and structures

At the southern end of The Hayes is St David's shopping centre, one of the largest shopping centres in the UK. Facing the centre is the former David Morgan department store which are now mixed use apartments and retail space. Spillers Records, which claims to be the oldest record shop in the world dating back to 1894, was situated here until 2010, when it moved to the nearby Morgan Arcade, due to the rising rent.

At the northern end of the area, and in addition to John Lewis and Debenhams in St. David's, is Howells department store, which is part of the House of Fraser group. Opposite Howells is St David's Hall, a large concert hall and exhibition centre. Nearby is the Old Central Library, now a pub, wine bar and the Cardiff Visitors Centre. The Old Library will also be home to the Cardiff Story museum, opening in late 2010.

Centrally located in The Hayes is a statue of John Batchelor – a 19th-century Liberal politician.

Cardiff Central Library

The new Central Library opened on 14 March 2009. The former permanent Central Library was located a few hundred yards northeast of the present building and was knocked down to make way for the St. David's 2 development. The new library has six floors totalling and area of 55,000 ft² and 90,000 books.

St David's Hall

St David's Hall is a large performing arts and conference venue in The Hayes, and is the National Concert Hall and Conference Centre of Wales. It hosts the annual Welsh Proms, the Orchestral Series attracting renowned conductors and performers and the world-famous biennial Cardiff Singer of the World competition. As well as classical music it also plays host to jazz, soul, pop, rock, dance, children's, r&b, musicals and other forms of world music, as well as light entertainment artists. The foyers in the centre are open and have regular free performances from often local groups, and the many foyers, balconies and bar areas are also used to host art exhibitions. It also has its own Celebrity Restaurant, on top of the numerous bars.

Alliance

The sculpture consists of a large stainless steel and enamelled metal arrow column and a hoop, which glows in the dark, and falls and rises with the tide. Paid for by the St David's shopping centre as part of a £1.5m public art scheme in the city centre, it was installed in the space between the new mall and Cardiff Central Library

Adjoining streets
It is adjoined by:
 Trinity Street (towards Cardiff Market and Cardiff Castle)
 Working Street (towards Queens Arcade and Cardiff City Hall)
 Caroline Street (also known as Chippy Lane towards Cardiff Central bus station and St. Mary's Street)
 Mill Lane (towards St. Mary's Street and Central railway station)
 Bridge Road (towards Bute Street and Cardiff Bay)
 Bridge Street (Towards Queen Street station)

See also

Cardiff city centre
Cardiff Centenary Walk
List of shopping arcades in Cardiff

References

Shopping in Cardiff
Districts of Cardiff
Redevelopment projects in Cardiff
Castle, Cardiff
Streets in Cardiff